Joanne Larson holds the Michael W. Scandling Professorship at the University of Rochester Margaret Warner Graduate School of Education and Human Development . She is also chair of the Teaching, Curriculum, and Change department. In the past ten years, Larson has emerged as a leading scholar in the New Literacies Studies, the socioculturally situated study of literacy. Her work examines how language and literacy practices mediate social and power relations in elementary classrooms. Specifically, she studies urban schools and asks how do differences between access to participation in various literacy events affect student learning? Most recently, she has been using Michel Foucault's concept of heterotopia and critical geography to think about the relation of space and literacy. 

Her teaching includes courses on curriculum, diversity, qualitative research methods, discourse analysis, and literacy learning in elementary schools.

She earned her doctorate at the University of California, Los Angeles (UCLA) where she studied under notable scholars such as Kris Gutierrez, Alessandro Duranti, Peter McLaren, and Elinor Ochs.

She has published articles in Journal of Early Childhood Literacy, Research in the Teaching of English, Linguistics and Education, Discourse and Society, Written Communication and co-authored articles in Harvard Education Review, Language Arts, Urban Education and International Journal of Educational Reform. Her edited book Literacy as Snake Oil: Beyond the Quick Fix addresses the problem of the commodification of literacy. She also co-edited the Handbook of Early Childhood Literacy. Her newest book is Making Literacy Real: Theories and Practices in Learning and Teaching, co-authored with Jackie Marsh.

Sources 
Dr. Larson's Webpage
 Warner Graduate School of Education

1956 births
Living people
UCLA Graduate School of Education and Information Studies alumni
American education writers
Literacy advocates
American educational theorists
University of Rochester faculty